

All-time top 10 goalscorers
As of February 2, 2009

All-time top 10 appearances
As of January 29, 2022

Records
Brazilian football club statistics
Corinthians